Hangul Compatibility Jamo is a Unicode block containing Hangul characters for compatibility with the South Korean national standard KS X 1001 (formerly KS C 5601). Its block name in Unicode 1.0 was Hangul Elements.

Block

History
The following Unicode-related documents record the purpose and process of defining specific characters in the Hangul Compatibility Jamo block:

References

See also 

Unicode blocks
Compatibility